One More Light is the seventh studio album by American rock band Linkin Park. It was released on May 19, 2017, through Warner Bros. Records and Machine Shop. It is the band's first album to have a title track, as they felt that the song "One More Light" was the heart of the album. It is also the last Linkin Park album to be released before the death of lead vocalist Chester Bennington on July 20, 2017.

The band recorded the album between September 2015 and February 2017 in multiple studios. Band members Brad Delson and Mike Shinoda served as the album's primary producers. The sound of One More Light has been described as being more pop-focused, departing from the alternative rock and alternative metal sounds of their previous albums. The album features guest vocal appearances from Pusha T, Stormzy, and Kiiara, and production and songwriting collaborations with J. R. Rotem, Julia Michaels, Justin Tranter, Ross Golan, Andrew Goldstein, Blackbear, and Eg White.

The album's lead single, "Heavy", featuring Kiiara, was released on February 16, 2017. "Battle Symphony", "Good Goodbye", and "Invisible" were released as promotional singles prior to the album's release. "Talking to Myself" and "One More Light" were released as radio singles later on. The album performed well commercially, debuting at number one in several countries; it also became the band's fifth number-one album on the Billboard 200 and was certified Gold in five countries. Despite a positive commercial performance, it received mixed reviews from music critics. This, along with accusations of selling out, prompted an angry response from Bennington.

Background
In 2014, Linkin Park released their sixth studio album The Hunting Party. The album, produced by Mike Shinoda and Brad Delson, marked a shift from the overall rock sound in their previous albums produced with help of Rick Rubin. Shinoda began the pre-production of One More Light on his smart phone in mid-2015 during The Hunting Party Tour.  The main production began as soon as the tour ended. In the process, the band decided to write songs with some external help. They worked with Zayed Hassan, which resulted in his song "Sailing Through the Clouds", Martin Garrix, Hot Karl, Mike Baczor of the band Her0, The Lonely Island, which resulted in "Things in My Jeep", and One Ok Rock. None of these collaborations, however, made the final version of the album. The album marks the second to be self-produced following The Hunting Party.

Composition
As a new concept to the band, all the songs featured on the album began with vocals being recorded first. They worked on the story first, then the hook, and finally the music. In an interview with Zane Lowe, Shinoda explained the composition as, "In terms of the style of the record, it's one of the most diverse stylistically, there's more genres mashed into this album than anything we've ever put out. You don't hear a lot of super heavy guitars. There isn't any screaming on the record." He adds, "To some extent it is a very polished record. Stylistically we wanted to blend all of the sound and genres together in a way you can’t tell them apart". As to why they chose "Heavy" to present the album to the world, he told Billboard, "One of the reasons why we chose 'Heavy' as the first single is because it is really the core sound of the album. This wasn't a scenario where the whole album sounds one way and the single sounds different. This is how the album sounds. So we wanted to go out with a song like that, where everybody can get a sense of the direction of this body of work." According to him, a lot of songs on the album can make the listener think of old songs by The Cure or Tears for Fears.

In an interview with MusicRadar, Brad Delson explained,

Further elaborating on his guitar work, Delson said, "I love the acoustic work on 'Sharp Edges'. I really like all of the layering of guitars on 'Invisible' as well. There's also a really unique presentation of the guitar in a way that I don’t think we’ve ever done on a song called 'Sorry For Now'. That was one of the things that we were really excited about – it is wildly different to anything else that we have been doing."

The album features collaborations with songwriters and other artists. "Heavy" features vocals by pop singer Kiiara, and "Good Goodbye" features verses by rappers Pusha T and Stormzy. Genre-wise, the album has been described as pop, pop rock, electropop, and electronic rock.

Recording

The band had been writing and recording mostly in Los Angeles but also had a few sessions in London and Canada where they worked with a few songwriters. In Los Angeles, the band started working at the Larrabee Studios where they had worked for their previous album. After noticing the band needed a bit more space they shifted to Sphere Studios. Starting in the early 2016 the band decided, for the first time, to open up their process to fans through social media by doing live streams, posting pictures and videos of their day by day in the studio, and sending studio updates to their mailing list.

In an interview with Billboard, Shinoda said "We've focused almost exclusively on songwriting, not on sound, not on genre, not on arrangement, on words and melodies. And that is something Rick [Rubin] has always told us to do years past and we never listened because we started always track first. Now we're writing songs and now we're just starting to get into the style of that." While working with Justin Parker in London, Mike also learned a different approach to songwriting: to write without any sound in mind and, instead, write with meaning in mind. Instead of writing tracks piece by piece, the band wouldn't leave a session without having a song. It would all start as a conversation, and out of those the songs would build progressively from a chord progression to lyrics.

Among the collaborators are Justin Parker, Conner Youngblood, Jon Green, blackbear, Andrew Goldstein, Eg White, Emily Wright, Andrew Bolooki, Andrew Dawson, RAC, Corrin Roddick, and Ross Golan. American singer Kiiara also had a seven-hour session with Linkin Park to record her vocals for "Heavy", and rappers Stormzy and Pusha T contributed to the album with original verses. In the past, the band had a different approach to collaborations, as explained by Mike: "Usually it means we’ve finished the song but we'll ask somebody to add something to the top of it." He added: "Generally, here's how it would work: we'd get in the room with someone, and start on something from scratch with them. We worked mostly in the same way we always write songs, but with extra firepower in the room."

Bennington had also reached out to Billy Howerdel of A Perfect Circle to collaborate on a song for the album. The two collaborated on a track titled "Eat the Elephant", but it was ultimately left off the album, not really matching the direction One More Lights sound. Howerdel completely reworked the song musically and lyrically, and recorded it with Maynard James Keenan on vocals for their April 2018 album Eat the Elephant.

Artwork and packaging
In an interview with Kerrang! magazine, Shinoda explained that the children seen on the album cover are those of a friend of the band and represent what the band members feel when their respective families get together. The photo was shot at Venice Beach by Frank Maddocks, who has previously contributed to artworks for Deftones and Green Day's Revolution Radio. The album cover also somewhat resembles the logo of the film company Lakeshore Entertainment.

The album was made available on Linkin Park's official website in five different packages: CD + LPU membership, vinyl + LPU Membership, CD bundle, vinyl bundle, and the "Just Give Me Everything" box set. All offers were accompanied by an LPU digital membership. Both the CD bundle and vinyl bundle include a One More Light T-shirt and a silver Linkin Park logo enamel pin. The box set was bound inside a special One More Light super deluxe box with a 48-page hardcover book featuring all the best photos from the album package and all the lyrics, a unique 2.4" × 1.8" instant photo of the band, and a gold enamel pin set featuring a Linkin Park pin, an LP Hex logo pin, and a "OML" logo pin. It also included both the CD and vinyl versions of the album as well as the One More Light T-shirt.

Promotion

The first single, "Heavy", was released via Los Angeles radio station KROQ on February 16, 2017. The track is a duet with American singer and songwriter Kiiara, marking the first time a Linkin Park song from a studio album has featured a female vocalist. The song was written by Linkin Park with Julia Michaels and Justin Tranter, while Emily Wright and Andrew Bolooki handled vocal production. The band released a second track from the album, "Battle Symphony", on March 16, 2017, with an accompanying lyric video. A third track from the album, "Good Goodbye", was released for download on April 13, 2017, along with an accompanying lyric video followed by a music video. The song features American rapper Pusha T and English hip hop artist Stormzy. On May 10, 2017, the band put out one final pre-release track, "Invisible", with an accompanying lyric video. "Talking to Myself" was sent to alternative radio July 25, 2017, as the album's second official single. The music video for "Talking to Myself" was released on July 20, 2017, the same day of Bennington's death.

In early 2017, the band introduced Linkin Park Global Ambassadors, which were selected each for a country. The ambassadors would promote the Linkin Park updates in their respective countries. The Ambassadors were also given various tasks respective to the updates. For promotional purposes, a picture of TV color bars was uploaded to the Instagram by the Linkin Park Global Ambassadors and many other people related to the band such as Joe Hahn, Mike Shinoda, Chester Bennington, Phoenix, Lorenzo Errico, Adam Ruehmer, Jim Digby, Christian Tachiera, Tobias Fance, Frank Maddocks, Tal Cooperman, and Warner Bros. Records' official account. The band also released a series of 8 videos on their official website showing fans their process of creating songs for the album. On February 13, Linkin Park tweeted a blank grid, and each of the Linkin Park Global Ambassadors tweeted a numbered image. When put together, the images formed the album cover. The lyrics of "Heavy" were unveiled on Genius on the same day.

Linkin Park did a stripped-down performance with Kiiara at NRG Studios, which was broadcast live on Facebook the same day "Heavy" was released along with its lyric video and the album pre-order. The stripped-down version of the song was performed on various occasions. Shinoda and Bennington played the song fourteen times at different venues for the promotion. The band played the song on The Late Late Show with James Corden and at the ECHO Awards 2017 with Kiiara.

Acoustic performances of the lead single by Chester Bennington and Mike Shinoda helped promote One More Light. A few of them included performances with Kiiara, Waxx, and Sofia Karlberg.

The band embarked on a world tour in the promotion of the album, which began in South America in May 2017. The tour included stops at various festivals, including the Download Festival Paris, Aerodrome Festival, NovaRock, Impact Festival, I-Days Milano, Hellfest, Download Festival Madrid, Hurricane Festival, Southside Festival, Telekom VOLT Fesztivál, Bråvalla Festival, Rock Werchter, and many others.Linkin Park Tickets, Tour Dates 2017 & Concerts Songkick The tour visited 20 cities in South America and Europe. The North American and Japan legs of the tour were cancelled following Chester Bennington's death on July 20, 2017.

Reception
Critical reception

At Metacritic, which assigns a normalized rating out of 100 to reviews from mainstream critics, the album has an average score of 46 out of 100 based on 7 reviews, which indicates "mixed or average" reviews. NME criticized the album's quality, giving it a 2/10 score and concluding that "It’s harsh to criticise a great band for trying something different, and it’s not an issue that this is a pop album. The issue is that it’s a weak and contrived commercial move (perhaps to compete with the likes of Twenty One Pilots)." Neil Z. Yeung of AllMusic agreed, stating that "The issue isn't that it's a pop effort; indeed, they get points for a brave attempt so outside of their wheelhouse. The problem is that much of One More Light is devoid of that visceral charge that previously defined much of their catalog... there's no feral screaming from Chester Bennington, there are barely any riffs, and DJ Hahn has disappeared beneath the textured studio sheen." Team Rock criticized the move away from rock music, stating that the album "makes Ed Sheeran sound like Extreme Noise Terror...With One More Light, Linkin Park have waved goodbye to rock." Troy L. Smith at The Plain Dealer described "Invisible" and "Nobody Can Save Me" as "well-rounded pop songs," but also noting, "That won't stop Linkin Park diehards from getting a sweet tooth from the whiny 'Halfway Right' or the boring title track. Heck, even Skrillex-like EDM can't save 'Sorry for Now' from corny territory." Consequence of Sound criticized the album for sounding like it was trying to "chase the trend of pop-EDM in an attempt to capitalize on its ubiquity" and sound "as if they were selected by committee", leading the album to sound like "a muddled mess of a record from a band that completely abandoned any sense of identity".

Newsday gave the album a B+ and praised the band's new direction, comparing it to the works of Coldplay and Owl City and concluding "One More Light shows how well Linkin Park has absorbed the current pop scene and applied it to their own music to genuinely reflect who they are today, not who some fans want them to be."

Band response
The band, specifically frontman Chester Bennington, lashed out in response to the negative reception of One More Lights material. As documented through Spin magazine, in an interview with Music Week, Bennington, at the accusations that the band had "sold out", suggested that those people should "stab [themselves] in the face" and "move the fuck on" from the band's past sound. Similarly, in a separate interview with Kerrang, Bennington, in response to claims of selling out with the album, said "If you're gonna be the person who says like 'they made a marketing decision to make this kind of record to make money' you can fucking meet me outside and I will punch you in your fucking mouth." In the same interview, Mike Shinoda also rejected the claims that they had made the album "for monetary reasons", responding, "that's not how I operate." Bennington explained that the accusation of "selling out" angered him because he saw it as a personal attack, concluding that "when you make it personal, like a personal attack against who we are as people, like, dude, shut up. That means that I can actually have feelings about it and most of the time my feelings are 'I want to kill you'."

In response to the comments, Slipknot and Stone Sour frontman Corey Taylor stated that he understood Bennington's frustrations, but advised him to "be fortunate for what you have, be fortunate for the fact that people are still coming to see you to hear the music. Give it a little time, you have to give it a little time." Bennington later responded that he agreed with Taylor's statements, saying:

Commercial performance
The album debuted at number one on the US Billboard 200, beating out Kendrick Lamar's Damn to the top spot by selling 111,000 copies in its first week with 100,000 of which coming from pure sales. This would gift the band its sixth number one album on the Billboard 200 and the first since 2012's Living Things. The band is one of only a few bands to ever score six or more albums to peak at the top spot of the US Billboard charts.

One More Light debuted at number 4 in the United Kingdom, selling 16,100 copies in its first week. This would be the lowest charting album by the band in the country since their debut Hybrid Theory which also peaked at number 4.

Elsewhere, it debuted and peaked in Japan at number six (19,300 copies), number one in Canada (12,000 copies) and number two in Germany (20,000 copies). It was the world's best selling album of the week ending on June 3, 2017.

Track listingNotes Track listing and credits from streaming website Qobuz.
  signifies a co-producer
  signifies an additional producer
  signifies a vocal producer

Personnel
Credits adapted from the album's liner notes.Linkin ParkChester Bennington – lead vocals, backing vocals on "Invisible" and "Sorry for Now" 
Rob Bourdon – drums, backing vocals
Brad Delson – guitar, backing vocals, production
Dave "Phoenix" Farrell – bass, backing vocals
Joe Hahn – samples, programming, backing vocals, creative direction
Mike Shinoda – keyboard, backing vocals, programming; rap vocals on "Good Goodbye", lead vocals on "Invisible" and "Sorry for Now", creative direction, engineering, photography, productionAdditional musiciansKiiara – vocals on "Heavy"
Pusha T – rap vocals on "Good Goodbye"
Stormzy – rap vocals on "Good Goodbye"
Ilsey Juber – backing vocals on "Talking to Myself" and "Sharp Edges"
Ross Golan – backing vocals on "Halfway Right"
Eg White – guitar and piano on "One More Light"
Jon Green – additional guitar, backing vocals and bass on "Nobody Can Save Me"
Jesse Shatkin – additional keyboard and programming on "Invisible"
Andrew Jackson – additional guitar on "Talking to Myself"Technical'

Alejandro Baima – assistant engineer
Blackbear – co-producer 
Andrew Bolooki – vocal production 
Andrew Dawson – additional production 
Ryan DeMarti – A&R coordination
Lorenzo Errico – photography
Robin Florent – assistant mixing engineer 
Chris Galland – mixing engineer 
Chris Gehringer – mastering 
Serban Ghenea – mixing 
Andrew Goldstein – co-producer 
Jon Green – additional production 
John Hanes – mixing engineer 
Andrew Jackson – additional production 
Jeff Jackson – assistant mixing engineer 
Jerry Johnson – studio drum technician
Tom Kahre – vocal engineering for Pusha T 
Michael Keenan – additional production 
Peter J. Lee – art direction, creative direction, design, photography
Frank Maddocks	– art direction, creative direction, design, photography
Manny Marroquin – mixing 
Ethan Mates – engineering
Dan McCarroll – A&R
Josh Newell – engineering
RAC – additional production 
JR Rotem – co-production 
Jesse Shatkin – additional production , co-production 
Fraser T Smith – vocal engineering for Stormzy 
Alexander Spit – additional production 
Peter Standish – marketing
Christian Tachiera – photography
Jonna Terrasi – A&R
Warren Willis – studio assistant engineer
Emily Wright – vocal production

Charts

Weekly charts

Year-end charts

Certifications

References

2017 albums
Albums produced by Mike Shinoda
Linkin Park albums
Warner Records albums
Pop rock albums by American artists
Electropop albums